Despite many economic and social difficulties, Communications in Transnistria is well developed, including a CDMA2000 1xRTT network for mobile phones.

Numbers
Telephones - main lines in use:
150,000 land lines (est., 2006) (Two operators: JSC Interdnestrcom, Trans-Tele-Com)

Telephones - mobile cellular:
140,000 (est., 2006) (About 71% belong to JSC Interdnestrcom, a CDMA operator. The rest are GSM)

Telephone system:
Digital infrastructure, privatization of all services

Radio broadcast stations:
AM 5, FM 6, shortwave N/A (2006)

Television broadcast stations:
3 (2 covering all of Transnistria, 1 municipal for Tiraspol and Bender)

Internet Service Providers (ISPs):
2 (2005)

See also
 Media in Transnistria

References 

Transnistria
Mass media in Transnistria
Transnistria